Les Friction is an independent music group led by Helmut Vonlichten, Nihl Finch aka Evan Frankfort, and a singer named Paint. Helmut had previously collaborated with his brother Franz Vonlichten in their cinematic music project E.S. Posthumus until Franz's death in May 2010. Les Friction was announced in November 2011, and their self-titled debut album was released the following January.

Albums

Les Friction

The band's debut album, Les Friction, was composed by Helmut Vonlichten and Nihl Finch aka Evan Frankfort.

The album's first single "Torture" was released as a digital download on November 26, 2011, the second single "Louder than Words" was released on December 27, 2011, while the final single "Here Comes the Reign" was released on January 21, 2012, prior to the album's release date of January 24, 2012.

Track listing

 Louder than Words
 Torture (feat. Guitarist Bruce Watson)
 What You Need
 Here Comes the Reign
 World on Fire
 Save Your Life
 Sunday
 String Theory
 Come Back to Me (feat. Emily Valentine)

Digital instrumental tracks
Instrumental tracks were made available through iTunes, Amazon, and CDBaby MP3 album downloads.

Louder Than Words (Instrumental)
Torture (Instrumental)
What You Need (Instrumental)
Here Comes The Reign (Instrumental)
World On Fire (Instrumental)
Save Your Life (Instrumental)
Sunday (Instrumental)
String Theory (Instrumental)
Come Back To Me (Instrumental)

Usage

Portions of "Louder than Words" have been used in a trailer for Harry Potter and the Deathly Hallows – Part 2, Oz the Great and Powerful, and has also been played over the loudspeakers during the 2012 Rose Bowl.

Dark Matter

The band's second album, Dark Matter, was composed by Nihl Finch aka Evan Frankfort (The Spiritual Machines), and Helmut Vonlichten.

Track listing

 Your World Will Fail
 Who Will Save You Now
 Dark Matter
 I Remember (feat. Emily Valentine)
 Love Comes Home
 You Always Knew (feat. Lara Fabian)
 This Is a Call
 Firewall
 Your Voice
 Make Believe
 Kashmir

The End of the Beginning

The band's third album The End of the Beginning was released on June 6th, 2022.

Track listing

 The End of the Beginning
 Unhuman
 Collective Mind
 Fade to Black
 All That Mattered
 Quiet War
 No Remorse No Regrets
 Game Ender
 Black Smoke Assimilation
 World with No Sun

See also 
 E.S. Posthumus
 Two Steps from Hell

References

External links
 Les Friction Official Website
 Les Friction Official Facebook
 Les Friction Official Twitter
 Les Friction Official Tumblr
  Les Friction’s Debut Album Review
  Les Friction’s Dark Matter Album Review

Musical groups established in 2011
Musical groups from Los Angeles
Rock music groups from California
New-age music groups
Science fiction music
2011 establishments in California